Bilateral relations between South Sudan and the Sudan were officially started on 9 July 2011 following South Sudan's independence. Sudan became the first country in the world to recognize the independence of South Sudan. However, relations between South Sudan and Sudan have still been poor, with both sides supporting rebel groups in the other's territory.

History

Disputes

Abyei
Abyei is administered by Sudan, but also claimed by South Sudan. Abyei was supposed to have a referendum to determine which country it would be part of, but has been delayed pending discussion of disputes.

Kafia Kingi
Kafia Kingi is a South Sudan sovereign territory according to the authoritative 2005 Comprehensive Peace Agreement signed by both states, the UN, and Colin Powell representing the US, but has largely been controlled ever since then by Sudanese forces.  The binding 2005 agreement specifies use of the 1 January 1956 boundary.  Kafia Kingi was not transferred to Darfur in the north until 1960.

Heglig Oilfield
The town of Heglig, which is internationally recognised as Sudanese territory but which is also claimed by South Sudan.

Oil transit
South Sudan ceased producing oil on a complaint that Sudan was "stealing" its oil en route via pipeline to Port Sudan, the only accessible venue to sell South Sudanese oil beyond Sudan. Sudan responded saying that it was a "fee" for using the pipeline that was owned by Sudan. Several oil trucks were also briefly held by Sudan but later released saying it was a good faith initiative to lessen tensions.

In September 2012, Sudan and South Sudan agreed a deal on border security and oil production to permit oil exports from South Sudan through Sudan to continue. In May 2013, Sudanese President Omar al-Bashir threatened again to block oil transits via Sudan if South Sudan continued to support insurgents South Kordofan and Darfur.

Current status
Sudan became the first state in the world to recognise South Sudan as a sovereign state and said it intended to open an embassy in the South Sudanese capital of Juba. On the occasion of South Sudan's independence, Sudanese President Omar al-Bashir spoke to the delegation present for independence celebrations saying that he "congratulate[s] our brothers and sisters in South Sudan on the occasion of the declaration of their new state and the creation of the State of South Sudan in this dear part of our homeland." He also added that relations between the two can and must be fostered:
The gains we have made during the previous years that were achieved through a common belief on peace and mutual respect and the implementation of Comprehensive Peace Agreement require that we should protect them through the following:
Firstly, through sustainable peace;
Secondly, through establishing positive and distinguished neighbourly relations;
Thirdly, through common interests by exchanging economic and trade benefits;
Fourthly, through preserving the psychological, emotional and social relations between the two peoples.

Cultural relations
Prior to independence there were also numerous Southern Sudanese, mostly blue collar, workers in the north. At the time of the referendum there was a split on the issue of partitioning the country amid Sudan's claim that they would have to return or apply for work permits.

Economic relations include the transfer of South Sudanese oil via Sudanese pipelines to the Red Sea for export.

Bilateral visits
The Sudanese President Omar al-Bashir was scheduled to make his first visit to the south on 12 April 2013 since independence.

See also
War in Darfur

References

 
Sudan
Bilateral relations of Sudan